A list of Bangladeshi films released in 1999.

Releases

See also

1999 in Bangladesh

References

Film
Bangladesh
 1999